Untrapped is the tenth studio album by American rapper Yo Gotti. It was released through Epic Records, Roc Nation and Collective Music Group on January 31, 2020, marking  Gotti's fourth and final album under his initial Epic Records contract. It features guest appearances from Lil Uzi Vert, A Boogie wit da Hoodie, Blac Youngsta, Estelle, Lil Baby, Megan Thee Stallion, Moneybagg Yo, Rick Ross and Ty Dolla Sign.

Commercial performance
Untrapped debuted at number ten on the US Billboard 200 chart, earning 35,000 album-equivalent units (including 7,000 in pure album sales) in its first week. This became Yo Gotti's fourth consecutive top-ten debut on the chart.

Track listing

Charts

References

2020 albums
Yo Gotti albums
Collective Music Group albums
Albums produced by Cubeatz
Albums produced by Tay Keith
Albums produced by 1500 or Nothin'
Albums produced by Southside (record producer)